Adlai E. Stevenson High School is a public high school located in Livonia, Michigan, a suburb west of Detroit.

History
Adlai E. Stevenson High School was built in 1965 to accommodate the rising population of Livonia with the increased migration of people from Detroit to the suburbs during the 1960s. It was dedicated on October 24, 1965, United Nations Day, and the 20th anniversary of that body's founding, by Vice President Hubert H. Humphrey. Stevenson was the first high school in the nation to be named for the Fifth U.S. Ambassador to the United Nations, Adlai E. Stevenson, who had died the day before the Livonia school board's decision on naming the new high school. The school's first graduating class graduated in June 1968.

Athletics
Stevenson is a Class A athletic school and is part of the Kensington Lakes Activities Association playing in the new East division formed in 2018.

Championships
Boys ice hockey state champions in  2013 
Boys soccer state champions in 1982, 1985, 1986, 1988, 1991, 1996 
Girls soccer state champions in 1990, 1997, 1998 
Girls pom pon division two state champions in 1998, 2019

References

External links 

 

Public high schools in Michigan
Educational institutions established in 1965
Livonia, Michigan
Schools in Wayne County, Michigan
1965 establishments in Michigan